The Local Rag is a monthly alternative newspaper published in Red Lodge, Montana. It focuses on local content, as the name implies, and is shipped free to every mailing address in Red Lodge and the surrounding towns of Bearcreek, Fox, Roberts, Luther, and Washoe. The Local Rag is funded by advertising.

Circulation varies depending on time of year. A typical press run is 3,600 to 4,600 copies. In addition to the mailed copies, it is also distributed in stores, bars, and restaurants in Red Lodge.

The paper was founded in 1991 by Lou Ward, former owner of the Jemez Valley Voice in New Mexico.

References

External links
 Official website

Newspapers published in Montana